Parties to the Chemical Weapons Convention encompasses the states that have ratified or acceded to the Chemical Weapons Convention, a multilateral treaty outlawing the production, stockpiling, and use of chemical weapons. In addition, these states are members of the Organisation for the Prohibition of Chemical Weapons''' (OPCW).

On January 13, 1993, the Convention was opened for signature. Fiji became the first state to ratify the Convention on January 20, 1993. Pursuant to article 21 of the Convention, it entered into force on April 29, 1997, after it had been ratified by 65 states. The Convention was closed for signature on the preceding day, and states that did not sign the Convention can now only accede to it. Pursuant to article 21 of the Convention, for states that ratify or accede to the Convention after this date, the Convention enters into force 30 days after their deposit of the instrument of ratification or accession.

A total of 197 states may become parties to the Chemical Weapons Convention, including 193 United Nations member states, the Cook Islands, Niue, Palestine, and Vatican City. As of August 2022, 193 states have ratified or acceded to the Convention (most recently Palestine on 17 May 2018) and another state (Israel) has signed but not ratified the Convention. Only Egypt, North Korea, and South Sudan have neither signed nor acceded to the Convention. All four states which are not parties are suspected of possessing chemical weapons.

Of the four non-parties, South Sudan stated in December 2017 that it "has all but concluded the process of joining the Organisation for the Prohibition of Chemical Weapons".  Ahmet Üzümcü, the Director-General of the OPCW, has stated that Egypt, Israel, and North Korea had "regional reasons" for not joining. Egypt has promised to ratify the Convention if Israel, the only state in the Middle East that is believed to possess nuclear weapons, ratifies the Treaty on the Non-Proliferation of Nuclear Weapons. Israel, meanwhile, has stated that it will ratify the Convention if all other non-parties in the region (of which only Egypt remains) do so as well. In addition, Israel has been reluctant to ratify due to an unwillingness to grant OPCW inspectors access to its military bases. North Korea is thought to be unlikely to become a party for the foreseeable future.

List of state parties

States that have signed but not ratified
  – 13 January 1993

Non-signatory states 
The following states are eligible to become parties to the Convention, but have not acceded to it.

States with limited recognition 
 – though not eligible to become a party to the Convention due to its limited recognition, it has stated that it attempts to comply with the Convention.

See also 
 Australia Group
 List of parties to the Biological Weapons Convention
 List of parties to the Convention on Certain Conventional Weapons
 List of parties to the Comprehensive Nuclear-Test-Ban Treaty
 List of parties to the Treaty on the Non-Proliferation of Nuclear Weapons
List of parties to the Treaty on the Prohibition of Nuclear Weapons
 List of parties to the Ottawa Treaty
 List of parties to the Partial Nuclear Test Ban Treaty
List of parties to weapons of mass destruction treaties

Notes

References

External links 
 OPCW Member States

Chemical Weapons Convention
Chemical warfare
Chemical weapons demilitarization
Chemical Weapons Convention
Organisation for the Prohibition of Chemical Weapons